Marlene Johnson (born January 11, 1946) is an American politician and businesswoman who served as the 42nd lieutenant governor of Minnesota, the first woman to hold the office. She was elected as the running mate of Governor Rudy Perpich and served from 1983 to 1991.

Early life 
Johnson was born and raised in Braham, Minnesota.

Career

Politics 
As Lieutenant governor of Minnesota, Johnson focused on strengthening and expanding the state's connections with the rest of the world in trade, tourism, education, and the arts. She was a particularly outspoken advocate of international educational exchange at the secondary and post-secondary level. She was also awarded the Order of the Polar Star by the Kingdom of Sweden in 1988.

After leaving office in 1991, Johnson ran for mayor of St. Paul, Minnesota, but lost the primary election to Norm Coleman. Later that year, President Bill Clinton appointed her associate administrator for management services and human resources in the General Services Administration.

Later career 
Johnson served as the executive director of NAFSA: Association of International Educators, the world's largest nonprofit association dedicated to international education. NAFSA's nearly 10,000 members enable international education opportunities for thousands of students each year.

Johnson also serves on the board of the Communications Consortium Media Center in Washington, D.C., the advisory council of the US-China Education Trust, the Senior Advisory Council of Business for Diplomatic Action, and the advisory board of the Center for Women's Intercultural Leadership at Saint Mary's College. She is a former board member of the Alliance for International Educational and Cultural Exchange at AFS Intercultural Programs, the World Press Institute, and the National Association of Women Business Owners.

See also
List of female governors in the United States
List of female lieutenant governors in the United States

References

External links 
Minnesota Historical Society

1946 births
Living people
People from Braham, Minnesota
Lieutenant Governors of Minnesota
Minnesota Democrats
Women in Minnesota politics
20th-century American politicians
20th-century American women politicians
21st-century American women